Los Flamers are a Mexican Cumbia band, formed in the mid-1960s by Roberto Eugenio Bueno Campos. They are known for their hits such as "El Chicle", "El Tizón","Juana La Cubana", "Atol de Elote", "Juana La Bailadora", "Viva El Amor", "Mira Mira Mira" and "Camarón Pelao". Members of the group include Roberto Bueno, Armando Vazquez, Paco Valerio, Fernando Lopez, Manny Dominguez, Salvador Iglesias, Jose Pacheco, Yoc Pacheco, Sammy Sánchez and David Roman.

Between 1978 and 1995 they released a string of albums on RCA Records/Sony BMG. They began their career doing [[cover versions of songs by US and British bands, and became one of the most popular cumbia groups in Mexico.

Discography
 Los Flamers (1978), Sony BMG/RCA
 Los Flamers 2, RCA
 Los Flamers 3, RCA
 Los Flamers 4, RCA
 Bailemos Cumbiarengue (1985), RCA
 Te Amo Chunchaca (1990), RCA
 Gran Reventon, RCA
 Gran Reventon vol. 2 (1990), Sony BMG/RCA
 Flamazo Navideño (1990), Sony BMG/RCA
 Atol De Elote (1990), BMG
 Los Reyes del Baile (1991), RCA
 Dime Si Te Gusto (1992), RCA
 Gran Reventon Gran, Vol. 7 (1992), Sony BMG/RCA
 O Que O Que O Que (1993), RCA
 Agua (1995), Musart
 Amor a Primera Vista (1995), Musart
 Gran Reventon '95 (1996), Musart
 Flamazo '96 (1996), Musart
 Flamazo '97 (1997)		
 Flamazo '98 (1998), Musart		
 Gran Reventon '98 (1999), Musart		
 Flamazo '99 (1999), Musart	
 Gran Reventon '99 (1999), Musart
 Gran Reventon Navideno (2001), Universal Music Latino
 A Puro Flamazo (2002), I.M.
 Y Siguen los Flamazos (2002), I.M.
 20 Super Flamazos (2003), I.M.
 Flamozos (2003), RCA
 Flamazo Colombiano (2003), Sony BMG/RCA
 Flamazo Dinamita (2003), I.M.
 Reventón Navideño (2004), I.M.
 Pendiente (2004), I.M.
 Flamazo Reggaeton (2007), International Latin America
 Gran Baile Navideño (2008)
 Serie 20 Exitos
 De Puro Reventon, Vol. 1
 De Puro Reventon, Vol. 2
 Flamazo Tmbiriche
 La más grande colección navideña

References

External links 
 

Mexican musical groups